Neadmete modesta, common name the modest admete, is a species of sea snail, a marine gastropod mollusk in the family Cancellariidae, the nutmeg snails.

Description
The shell grows to a length of 16 mm.

Distribution
This species occurs in the demersal zone of the Pacific Ocean from the Aleutians to Baja California, Mexico, at depths between 1 m and 20 m.

References

 Petit, R.E. & Harasewych, M.G. (2005) Catalogue of the superfamily Cancellarioidea Forbes and Hanley, 1851 (Gastropoda: Prosobranchia)- 2nd edition. Zootaxa, 1102, 3–161. NIZT 682
 Hemmen J. (2007). Recent Cancellariidae. Wiesbaden, 428pp.
 Bisby, F.A., M.A. Ruggiero, K.L. Wilson, M. Cachuela-Palacio, S.W. Kimani, Y.R. Roskov, A. Soulier-Perkins and J. van Hertum 2005 Species 2000 & ITIS Catalogue of Life: 2005 Annual Checklist. CD-ROM; Species 2000: Reading, U.K

External links

Cancellariidae
Gastropods described in 1864
Taxa named by Philip Pearsall Carpenter